The Foreign Affairs Policy Board is an advisory board that provides independent advice and opinion to the Secretary of State, the Deputy Secretary of State, and the Director of Policy Planning on matters concerning U.S. foreign policy. The Board reviews and assesses global threats and opportunities, trends that implicate core national security interests, tools and capacities of the civilian foreign affairs agencies, and priorities and strategic frameworks for U.S. foreign policy. The Board meets in a plenary session several times a year at the U.S. Department of State in the Harry S. Truman Building.

History

The Foreign Affairs Policy Board was launched in December 2011 under Secretary Hillary Clinton and modeled after the Defense Policy Board of the U.S. Department of Defense. The Board's first meeting was held on December 19, 2011.

Membership
The Board is chartered to have up to 25 members who serve two-year terms. Board members have a wide range of expertise and backgrounds, including past government service, academia, politics, development, business, and think tanks.

Current members (as of June 2022)
Thomas Donilon (Co-Chair), Chairman, BlackRock Investment Institute
Cecilia Muñoz (Co-Chair), former member of White House Domestic Policy Council under President Obama 
David Autor, Ford Professor in the Massachusetts Institute of Technology Department of Economics and Vice President of the American Economic Association
Dr. Sameer Bhalotra, co-founder & CEO of ActZero, a security company based in Menlo Park, California
Hal Brands, Henry A. Kissinger Distinguished Professor of Global Affairs at the Johns Hopkins School of Advanced International Studies (SAIS) and a senior fellow at the American Enterprise Institute
Mariano-Florentino Cuéllar, tenth president of the Carnegie Endowment for International Peace
Mitchell E. Daniels, Jr., 12th president of Purdue University and the former governor of Indiana
Janine Davidson, Ph.D., president of Metropolitan State University of Denver, Colorado’s third largest and most diverse public university
Cathy Feingold, Director of the AFL-CIO’s International Department
Dr. Margaret Hamburg, former Commissioner of the U.S. Food and Drug Administration
Jon Huntsman, Jr., Vice Chair of Ford Motor Company and former U.S. Ambassador to China and Russia
Dr. Ayana Elizabeth Johnson, co-founder of Urban Ocean Lab, a think tank for the future of coastal cities.
Ambassador Kristie Kenney, former U.S. diplomat
Gilman Louie, CEO and co-founder of America’s Frontier Fund
Katherine Maher, former CEO and Executive Director of the Wikimedia Foundation
Dr. James Manyika, Senior Vice President at Alphabet Inc.
Meghan L. O’Sullivan, former deputy national security advisor on Iraq and Afghanistan
Annise Parker, former Houston Mayor and City Controller
Vincent Stewart, USMC, former Deputy Commander at the United States Cyber Command

Past members
The following are past members of the Foreign Affairs Policy Board as of 2019:
Liaquat Ahamed, author and winner of the Pulitzer Prize for History
Douglas Beck, Vice President, Americas and Northeast Asia for Apple, Inc.
R. Nicholas Burns, former Under Secretary of State for Political Affairs under President George W. Bush
Johnnie Carson, former Assistant Secretary of State for African Affairs under President Barack Obama
Stephen A. Cheney, retired Brigadier General and CEO of the American Security Project
Jared Cohen, Founder and CEO of Jigsaw at Alphabet Inc. and former Member of the Policy Planning Staff under Secretaries of State Condoleezza Rice and Hillary Clinton 
Nelson Cunningham, President and co-founder of McLarty Associates
Paula Dobriansky, former Under Secretary of State for Global Affairs and President's Envoy to Northern Ireland under President George W. Bush
Karen Donfried, President of the German Marshall Fund of the United States
Jim Donovan (banker), Managing Director at Goldman Sachs
David Dreier, former member of the U.S. House of Representatives and chairman of the House Rules Committee
Anne M. Finucane, Global Chief of Strategy and Marketing at Bank of America
Ann Fudge, former chairman and CEO of Young & Rubicam Brands
Helene Gayle, former president and CEO of CARE
Stephen J. Hadley, former National Security Advisor under President George W. Bush
Cecil D. Haney, 4-star Admiral (Ret.), United States Navy and former STRATCOM Commander
Jane Harman, President of the Woodrow Wilson International Center for Scholars
Carla A. Hills, Co-Chair of the Council on Foreign Relations and former U.S. Trade Representative under President George H. W. Bush
Alberto Ibargüen, President and CEO of the John S. and James L. Knight Foundation
Robert Kagan, Senior Fellow in foreign policy at the Brookings Institution
William Kennard, former U.S. Ambassador to the European Union
Robert Kimmitt, former U.S. Ambassador to Germany, former Deputy Secretary of the Treasury and Under Secretary of State for Political Affairs under President George H. W. Bush
Jim Kolbe, former member of the U.S. House of Representatives
Stephen Krasner, former Director of Policy Planning under President George W. Bush
Daniel C. Kurtzer, professor of Middle East studies at Princeton University and former U.S. Ambassador to Israel and Egypt
Mack McLarty, former White House Chief of Staff under President Bill Clinton
Michael Mullen, retired United States Navy admiral and former Chairman of the Joint Chiefs of Staff under Presidents George W. Bush and Barack Obama
Vali Nasr, Dean of the Paul H. Nitze School of Advanced International Studies and Senior Fellow in foreign policy at the Brookings Institution
John D. Negroponte, former Deputy Secretary of State and the first Director of National Intelligence
Jacqueline Novogratz, founder and CEO of Acumen
Joseph S. Nye, political scientist and professor at Harvard University
Thomas R. Pickering, former Under Secretary of State for Political Affairs and former U.S. Ambassador to the United Nations
John Podesta, former White House Chief of Staff under President Bill Clinton and Counselor to President Barack Obama
William Roedy, former Chairman and CEO of MTV Networks International 
Susan Schwab, former United States Trade Representative under President George W. Bush
Anne-Marie Slaughter, President and CEO of New America and former Director of Policy Planning under Secretary Hillary Clinton
Clifford Sobel, former U.S. Ambassador to the Netherlands and U.S. Ambassador to Brazil under President George W. Bush
James Steinberg, former United States Deputy Secretary of State
Louis B. Susman, former U.S. Ambassador to the United Kingdom under President Barack Obama
Strobe Talbott, President of the Brookings Institution and former Deputy Secretary of State under President Bill Clinton
Laura Tyson, former director of the National Economic Council and the chair of the Council of Economic Advisers under President Bill Clinton
Thomas J. Vallely, senior advisor for Mainland Southeast Asia at the Ash Center for Democratic Governance and Innovation
Richard Verma, former U.S. Ambassador to India
Charles David Welch, former U.S. Ambassador to Egypt and Assistant Secretary of State for Near Eastern Affairs under President George W. Bush
Christine Todd Whitman, former Administrator of the Environmental Protection Agency under President George W. Bush and the 50th Governor of New Jersey

References

External links
Foreign Affairs Policy Board on the State Department's website

United States Department of State
United States Department of State agencies
American advisory organizations
United States foreign policy
2011 establishments in Washington, D.C.